"Don't Turn Off the Lights" is a song by Spanish singer Enrique Iglesias from his second English-language studio album, Escape (2001). The song was written by Iglesias, Steve Morales, Kara DioGuardi, and Dave Siegel and was released as the third single from the album in the United States, Canada, Australia, and New Zealand. The song was produced by Morales, and Cuban-American singer Jon Secada provides backing vocals on the track. A Spanish-language version titled "No apagues la luz" was also recorded.

Background
In interviews, Enrique Iglesias has stated that for the album Escape, he started using a different method to writing songs than he had used before. Starting off with a title or single idea he would write the song around it. "Don't Turn Off the Lights" was the first song to use this method and set the tone for many of the other songs on the album. At the time it was expected that the song would be the album's first, in an interview with Mexican radio station Exa FM, Iglesias stated that he believed the track would be the first single from his then-upcoming album.

The single was released on 20 May 2002 in the United States and on 22 July 2002 in Australia. It became a success in Australia and New Zealand, peaking inside the top 10 in both countries. It was not as successful in the United States, reaching number 10 on the Bubbling Under Hot 100. The song however did significantly push up sales of the album in the US during Iglesias's promotion. Iglesias promoted the week of Thanksgiving, performing the song on TV shows Last Call with Carson Daly, MTV's TRL, Live with Regis and Kelly and the Today Show summer concert series, where he attracted the largest crowd of Summer Concert series to date.

Music video
The video for the single features footage of Iglesias performing in concert, relaxing backstage/off tour and interacting with fans.

Track listings
European CD single
 "Don't Turn Off the Lights" (album version) – 3:47
 "Hero" (from The One and Only Show—UK) – 4:38

US CD single
 "Don't Turn Off the Lights"
 "No apagues la luz"

Australian maxi-CD single
 "Don't Turn Off the Lights" (LP version) – 3:47
 "Don't Turn Off the Lights" (Fernando Garibay & Giorgio Moroder remix) – 4:23
 "Don't Turn Off the Lights" (Fernando Garibay & Giorgio Moroder extended mix) – 7:30
 "Escape" (StoneBridge radio mix) – 4:32
 "Escape" (JJ's radio edit) – 3:25
 "Escape" (video) – 3:30
 A CD single without the video was also issued.

Credits and personnel
Credits are lifted from the Escape album booklet.

Studios
 Recorded at Hit Factory Criteria (Miami, Florida)
 Mastered at Bernie Grundman Mastering Studio (Hollywood, California)

Personnel

 Enrique Iglesias – writing, vocals, background vocals, co-production, vocal production
 Steve Morales – writing, background vocals, programming, production, vocal production
 Kara DioGuardi – writing, background vocals, vocal production
 David Siegel – writing, keyboards
 Jon Secada – background vocals
 Aaron Fishbein – guitar

 Sebastian Krys – mixing
 Carlos Paucar – engineering
 Shane Stoner – engineering
 Fabian Marasciullo – assistant engineering
 Marc Lee – assistant engineering
 Ivy Skoff – production coordination
 Brian Gardner – mastering

Charts

Weekly charts

Year-end charts

Certifications

Release history

References

2001 songs
2002 singles
Enrique Iglesias songs
Songs written by Kara DioGuardi
Songs written by Enrique Iglesias
Songs written by Steve Morales
Songs written by David Siegel (musician)